The hill prinia (Prinia superciliaris) is a species of passerine bird in the family Cisticolidae.

It is found in  China, India, Indonesia, Laos, Malaysia, Myanmar, Thailand and Vietnam.  It was formerly considered con-specific with the black-throated prinia.

References

hill prinia
Birds of South China
Birds of Yunnan
Birds of Southeast Asia
hill prinia
Taxonomy articles created by Polbot